I due Figaro, o sia Il soggetto di una commedia is an 1820 opera (melodramma buffo) in two acts by Michele Carafa to a libretto by Felice Romani based on Les deux Figaro by Honoré-Antoine Richaud Martelly. The opera is a homage to Mozart, and tells of the further adventures of Cherubino, returned after 12 years in the army. 

Aimé Leborne (1797-1866) arranged his friend Carafa's work as Les deux Figaro at the Théâtre Odéon, Paris 22 August 1827.

Recording
I Due Figaro. Simon Bailey (Cherubino), Carmine Monaco (Figaro), Giorgio Trucco (Il Conte), Rosella Bevacqua (Contessa Rosina), Cinzia Rizzone (Susanna), Vittorio Prato (Plagio), Eunshil Kim (Inez), Giuseppe Fedeli (Torribio), Württembergische Philharmonie Reutlingen, Brad Cohen Kurhaus Bad Wildbad 2006 DVD

References

Operas
1820 operas
Libretti by Felice Romani
Works based on The Marriage of Figaro